Mabel and Fatty Viewing the World's Fair at San Francisco is a 1915 American short comedy-documentary film both starring and directed by Roscoe Arbuckle and Mabel Normand.

Production background
Producer Mack Sennett brought Arbuckle and Normand to the Panama–Pacific International Exposition, also known as the 1915 San Francisco World's Fair. They turned the cameras around, using the Fair crowds as extras and the Fair itself as a free background. Arbuckle and Normand clowned around and interacted with the Fair's surprised attendees. The film ends with a nighttime view of the fair, including a scene with the "Captive Aeroplane", an early amusement ride.

Prints of the film exist in the Library of Congress film archive.

Cast
 Roscoe 'Fatty' Arbuckle as himself
 Mabel Normand as herself
 Hank Mann
 James Rolph Jr., Mayor of San Francisco, as himself (as Mayor Rolph)
 Mme. Ernestine Schumann-Heink as herself
 Al St. John

See also
 Fatty Arbuckle filmography
 Fatty and Mabel at the San Diego Exposition (1915)

References

External links

Mabel and Fatty Viewing the World's Fair at San Francisco available for free download at Internet Archive

1915 films
1915 comedy films
1915 documentary films
1915 short films
Silent American comedy films
American short documentary films
American silent short films
American black-and-white films
Films directed by Roscoe Arbuckle
Films directed by Mabel Normand
Films produced by Mack Sennett
Keystone Studios films
Panama–Pacific International Exposition
Black-and-white documentary films
Documentary films about San Francisco
American comedy short films
World's fairs in fiction
1910s American films